Varvara Akritidou (born July 15, 1981 in Thessaloniki) is a Greek judoka, who competed in the women's half-heavyweight category. She held two Greek senior titles in her own division, picked up a total of six medals in her career, and represented her home nation Greece at the 2004 Summer Olympics in Athens.

Akritidou qualified for the Greek squad in the women's half-heavyweight class (78 kg) at the 2004 Summer Olympics in Athens, by filling up an entry by the International Judo Federation and the Hellenic Olympic Committee, as Greece received an automatic berth for being the host nation. She lost her opening match to an experienced Ukrainian judoka Anastasiia Matrosova, who successfully scored an ippon and dropped her to the tatami with a sukui nage (double leg takedown) assault at two minutes. In the repechage, Akritidou raised her hopes of claiming an Olympic bronze medal for the host nation, but slipped them away in a defeat to South Korea's Lee So-yeon by an ippon and a kami shiho gatame one minute and sixteen seconds into their first playoff of the draft.

References

External links
 
 Hellenic Judo Federation Bio 

1981 births
Living people
Greek female judoka
Olympic judoka of Greece
Judoka at the 2004 Summer Olympics
Sportspeople from Thessaloniki
21st-century Greek women